Aliabad Rural District is a rural district (dehestan) in the Central District of Qaem Shahr County, Mazandaran Province, Iran. At the 2006 census, its population was 24,184, in 6,455 families. The rural district has 18 villages:
Abmal
Afra Koti
Ahangar Kola
Chaleh Zamin
Chepi
Denj Kola
Eskandar Kola
Fulad Kola
Gol Afshan
Macheh Bon
Malek Kola
Matan Kola
Qadi Kola-ye Bozorg
Shahrak-e Yasrab
Talar Posht-e Olya
Talar Posht-e Sofla
Vaskas
Vosta Kola

References 

Rural Districts of Mazandaran Province
Qaem Shahr County